The Missouri Western–Northwest Missouri State football rivalry between the Missouri Western Griffons football team and Northwest Missouri State Bearcats football team is between two Mid-America Intercollegiate Athletics Association NCAA Division II rivals that are less than 50 miles apart.

The schools off the field are constantly competing for state funds in the same market ever since Missouri Western expanded from a junior college to a four-year college in 1969 fulfilling a Missouri governor Warren Hearnes campaign promise to build the school St. Joseph, Missouri (2000 population 73,912). At the time Northwest at Maryville (2000 population 10,581) founded in 1905 was the sole four-year state college in northwest Missouri.

In 1988 the state under John Ashcroft recommended that Northwest be closed altogether.

In the wake of the ultimately abandoned proposal both schools have considerably ramped up their football programs with Northwest appearing in ten NCAA Division II National Football Championships (winning six) while Missouri Western has hosted the Kansas City Chiefs summer training camp starting since 2010.

The rivalry on the field is a big draw. The biggest crowds at Spratt Stadium are 10,129 in 2009 and 9,007 in 2007.  A crowd of 9,346 attended the September 13, 2008 game—the second biggest at Northwest's Bearcat Stadium. The 2010 game was attended by 10,805 the biggest in the stadium history.

Game results

A During the 2010 and 2011 college football seasons, the Griffons and Bearcats played twice; in this case, the second meeting was in the playoffs.

See also  
 List of NCAA college football rivalry games

References

College football rivalries in the United States
Missouri Western Griffons football
Northwest Missouri State Bearcats football
1981 establishments in Missouri